The Warmian-Masurian Voivodeship Sejmik is the regional legislature of the voivodeship of Warmian-Masurian, Poland. It is a unicameral body consists of thirty councillors elected in free elections for a five-year term. The current chairperson of the assembly is Bernadeta Hordejuk of the KO.

The assembly elects the executive board that acts as the collective executive for the regional government, headed by the province's marshal. The current Executive Board of Warmia-Masuria is a coalition government between Civic Coalition and Polish People's Party with Gustaw Brzezin of the PSL presiding as marshal.

The Regional Assembly meets in the Marshal's Office in Olsztyn.

Districts 

Members of the Assembly are elected from five districts, serve five-year terms. Districts does not have the constituencies formal names. Instead, each constituency has a number and territorial description.

See also 
 Polish Regional Assembly
 Warmian-Masurian Voivodeship

External links 
 (pl) Warmian-Masurian Regional Assembly

References

Warmian-Masurian
Assembly
Unicameral legislatures